Claudia Garde (born 1966 in Bremen) is a German film director and screenwriter. She has worked for the German TV-series Stubbe – Von Fall zu Fall, Doktor Martin, Flemming or the series Tatort.

Biography 
Claudia Garde, born in Bremen in 1966, after graduating from high school she first studied at acting schools in London and Paris. From 1992 to 1993 Garde worked in France as a theater actress at various theaters such as the Théâtre de l'épée de Bois, or the Compania del'Alma before she returned to Germany to study at the prestigious Film Academy Baden-Wuerttemberg the subjects of writing and directing. She acquired her diploma in directing in 1998 with the feature film Die Man Liebt ....

In the year 2000 she began her career as a director and screenwriter with several television films. and TV-series. So she worked alongside demanding series episodes such as Stubbe – Von Fall zu Fall, Doktor Martin or the series Flemming. For the TV-series Flemming she was nominated together with the screenwriter Gregor Edelmann for the Grimme-Preis in 2010. Beyond that she has directed some very popular episodes of the German Tatort series, where she has worked with actors like Axel Milberg, Klaus J. Behrendt or Simone Thomalla. The Tatort episode Kindstod was awarded the Golden Gong and received two German TV Awards.

For her TV movie Die Frau am Ende der Straße with Maren Eggert and Matthias Brandt in the leading roles, she received her first Grimme-Preis-nomination and won the VFF TV Movie Award in 2006.

In addition to her work as a director for film and television Claudia Garde has also worked as a freelance writer and lecturer. She lives and works in Berlin. With the British composer Colin Towns she connects a longer cooperation.

Awards 
 2006: VFF TV-Movie Award for the TV-Movie Die Frau am Ende der Straße
 2006: Grimme-Preis-Nomination for Die Frau am Ende der Straße
 2010: Grimme-Preis-Nomination in the category Fiction for Flemming with Gregor Edelmann

Selected filmography 

 1998: ...die man liebt...
 2000: Ich beiß zurück (TV film)
 2001: Paulas Schuld (TV film)
 2001: Tatort: Kindstod (TV series episode)
 2002: Mehr als nur Sex (TV film)
 2003: Ehespiele (TV film)
 2003: Stubbe – Von Fall zu Fall: Yesterday (TV series episode)
 2004: Tatort: Stirb und werde (TV series episode)
 2005: Tatort: Borowski in der Unterwelt (TV series episode)
 2006: Die Frau am Ende der Straße (TV film)
 2006: Tatort: Schattenspiele (TV series episode)
 2007: Auf dem Vulkan (TV film)
 2007: Tatort: Investigativ (TV series episode)
 2008: Tatort: Borowski und das Mädchen im Moor (TV series episode)
 2009: Ein Sommer mit Paul (TV film)
 2009: Doktor Martin (TV series, 6 episodes)
 2009: Flemming (TV series, 3 episodes)
 2010: Tatort: Borowski und der vierte Mann (TV series episode)
 2012: Bankraub für Anfänger (TV film)
 2012: Tatort:  (TV series episode)
 2014: Tatort: Frühstück für immer (TV series episode)
 2014: Das Glück der Anderen (TV film)
 2015: Tatort: Niedere Instinkte (TV series episode)
 2015: Tatort: Borowski und die Rückkehr des stillen Gastes (TV series episode)
 2017: Eine gute Mutter (TV film)
 2017:  (TV film)
 2019: Verliebt in Valerie (TV film)
 2019:  (TV film)
 2023:  (TV miniseries)

References

External links 
 Official website of Claudia Garde
 
 Films of Claudia Garde in: Filmlexikon
 Claudia Garde in: Above the line Berlin GmbH
 Interview with Claudia Garde

1966 births
Living people
Mass media people from Bremen